7 Cups (formerly called 7 Cups of Tea) is an online platform that provides counseling and therapy. The site connects users to "listeners", who have been trained in active listening, via anonymous text or voice chats. The site features distinct groups for adolescent minors and adults over the age of eighteen.

The website derives its name from the eponymous poem by the 9th-century Chinese poet Lu Tong. It is a Y Combinator startup founded by psychologist Glen Moriarty in July 2013.

References 
   
Digital Peer-Support Platform (7Cups) as an Adjunct Treatment for Women With Postpartum Depression: Feasibility, Acceptability, and Preliminary Efficacy Study - US National Library of Medicine National Institutes of Health

External links 
 

Crisis hotlines
Y Combinator companies